Nelourde Nicolas (born 26 July 1999) is a Haitian footballer who plays as a midfielder for French club RC Saint-Denis and the Haiti women's national team.

International goals
Scores and results list Haiti's goal tally first

References

External links 
 

1999 births
Living people
Women's association football midfielders
Haitian women's footballers
People from Ouest (department)
Haiti women's international footballers
Haitian expatriate footballers
Haitian expatriate sportspeople in France
Expatriate women's footballers in France